Bruce Milne (born 1957) is a prominent figure in the Australian music industry, a long-standing member of the grass-roots Melbourne music community who, after getting his start publishing a punk fanzine in the late 1970s, has done practically everything since – been a writer, radio presenter, DJ, run record shops, book shops and record labels, run bars and venues, and worked in A&R and as a tour promoter.

He started out producing fanzines and writing for rock magazines and working in public radio - he has been involved with 3RRR-FM since 1977, and was still doing a show for the station in 2023  - then worked for Missing Link Records, and then formed his own label-cum-shop Au-Go-Go, which defined a whole Melbourne sound and ethos in the 1980s/90s.

In the early 80s, Milne also ran the audio cassette magazine cassette-zine Fast Forward. After its demise and the demise of Au-Go-Go, he successively headed three other labels, Giant Claw, Reliant and In-Fidelity, who along with Au-Go-Go collectively debuted such bands as the Scientists, the Moodists, Harem Scarem, God, Magic Dirt, Spiderbait, the Meanies, the Datsuns, the 5.6.7.8s and many others.

After working in the late 90s/early 2000s in major label ventures and running the bar the International, Milne took over running the Collingwood pub the Tote, whose enforced closure in 2010 became the rallying point to keep live music alive in Melbourne.

Early life 
As the offspring of Melbourne bohemia (his mother, a child psychiatrist, co-wrote ABC-TV's Play School theme song; his brother Peter Milne is a noted photographer), the teenage Milne attend the famous Swinburne alternative school, a breeding ground for other such illustrious alumni as musician and friend Rowland S. Howard, film-maker Richard Lowenstein and comedian Gina Riley.

Career 
In 1977, Milne started his career as a volunteer announcer at 3CR; he put out Australia's first punk fanzine Plastered Press, put on the first-ever gig by the Boys Next Door, and helped put on the 'Punk Gunk' gig on the street in Carlton on New Year's Eve. In 1978, he joined forces with Clinton Walker when he moved to Melbourne and together they put out the Pulp fanzine  and presented the 3RRR show Know Your Product. He and Walker then got involved with the inception of Roadrunner magazine in Adelaide, and Milne formed the label Au-Go-Go Records to release a single by the band he then managed, seminal Melbourne post-punk outfit the Young Charlatans. But the band broke up before he could do so, so the label's first release became an EP by Swinburne mates Two Way Garden called Overnight.

Milne then went to work for Keith Glass on his Missing Link Records shop and label. Missing Link was a centre of the Melbourne scene in the early 80s, with bands on its label like the Birthday Party, the Laughing Clowns, Whirlywirld and the Go Betweens, and with Milne working behind the counter and in the backroom running Au-Go-Go. Milne also worked closely, if uncredited, on other labels, like Innocent Records, the brainchild of polymath Philip Brophy and musician David Chesworth. Brophy and Chesworth were driving forces behind the Clifton Hill Community Music Centre, which was another dimension to Melbourne's 'little bands' scene as portrayed in Richard Lowenstein's 1986 feature film Dogs in Space. Brophy, who designed the original Au-Go-Go logo, would go on as a long-standing collaborator with Milne.

At the end of 1978, Milne also got involved with Andrew Maine on the post-punk cassette-zine Fast Forward that had a world-wide impact and even inspired the launch of Sub-Pop in Seattle. When Keith Glass sold the Missing Link shop to concentrate, ill-fatedly, on its label iteration, Bruce Milne opened his own shop iteration of Au-Go-Go. With a new partner Greta Moon, he stepped up the label's profile, signing such acts as the Scientists and Dave Graney’s band the Moodists, and putting out seminal compilation albums like Asleep at the Wheel. When Andrew Maine wanted to take Fast Forward in a more Face-like club culture/dance music direction, the partnership and the venture folded.

While still running Au-Go-Go as it put out more records by bands like Little Murders, Harem Scarem, the Zimmermen and many others, Milne went back to 3RRR with Phil Brophy to launch, in 1985, the long-running, cult pop culture program Eeek! Au-Go-Go expanded in the mid-80s to start locally releasing recordings by emerging international acts like Sonic Youth, Mudhoney, Tav Falco's Panther Burns and Big Black, and then in the 90s tapped into a whole new wave of local underground bands like the Meanies, Spiderbait and Magic Dirt, before a split between Milne and Moon precipitated the label's demise. Au-Go-Go released one of the great Australian debut singles, God's "My Pal."

In the late 80s, Milne went into partnership with another old friend Peter Lawrance to open the Kill City crime bookshop. Kill City was itself another important cultural phenomenon, not only as a retail outlet but again, like Missing Link and Au-Go-Go, as a fulcrum to which fans and writers from all round the world beat a path, and as a venue for events, with a Sydney store eventually coming under the management of Clinton Walker. Kill City was an important feed into the establishment of the Ned Kelly Awards for Australian crime writing in the late 90s, and the shop also spawned David Honeybee's fanzine Crime Factory.

Milne compiled the series of albums Born Bad that ran to eight volumes celebrating the roots and the aesthetic of Milne's all-time favorite band the Cramps, complete with cover art by Phil Brophy. He pioneered links between Australia and the Japanese music underground, releasing recordings by bands like the 5.6.7.8s and compilation albums like Tokyo Trashville, and heading up the trans-national label Giant Claw, which released singles by American as well as Japanese and Australian bands. Around this period, Milne even played in a band, the Love Moods.

In the late 90s when Roger Grierson moved from PolyGram to Festival Records, the Australian major label owned by Rupert Murdoch, he offered Milne a label deal, and thus Reliant Records was born. Reliant signed bands like the Underground Lovers and Gerling, and in 1999 released the debut solo album by Milne's old schoolmate and former Birthday Party guitarist Rowland S. Howard, Teenage Snuff Film. Reliant folded when Milne moved to EMI to take up an A&R position, and when that fizzled out, in 2002, he went into partnership with Steve Stavrakis, who'd previously headed Waterfront Records in Sydney, and the pair launched In-Fidelity Records. In-Fidelity was an important label in the early 2000s, signing such acts as the Datsuns, Dan Kelly, the Drones, the Dirtbombs, Japan's Guitar Wolf and others.

After gaining experience running the venue the International Bar in Melbourne’s Chinatown, Milne took over the Tote Hotel in Collingwood, which was by then already a favorite watering-hole on the Melbourne live circuit. But with the government trying to stamp out rowdy late-night behaviour in the city, the Tote was made a scapegoat, and Liquor Licensing Victoria forced it to shut down. The closure of the Tote in 2010 became a cause celebre and not just in Melbourne but throughout the country, forcing state governments to re-think the worth of a vibrant music culture and night-time economy. "The Tote can't be saved," Milne said to the crowd outside the pub at a massive rally on its last night, "but live music in Melbourne can."

With such bodies as Music Victoria and SLAM (Save Live Australian Music) supporting it the Melbourne circuit survived, to thrive in fact, and even the Tote itself was eventually resurrected too. But Bruce Milne was the martyr to the cause and he was financially decimated.

Milne has subsequently bounced back, however, returning to Greville St in Prahran, where he'd previously had Kill City, to go into the Greville Records store there, and he has returned, again, to 3RRR, to present the Sunday night show Where Yo Is.

Milne is married and lives in Melbourne and is also currently hosting bus tours about Melbourne's music history with Mary Mihelakos and Australian Music Vault.

References 
General
 Walker, Clinton Stranded: Australian Independent Music, 1976-1992 (2021) Hamburg, Germany: Visible Spectrum ISBN 978-1-953835-08-6
 Homan, Shane; O’Hanlon, Seamus; Strong, Catherine; Tebutt, John Music City Melbourne (2021) Bloomsbury USA ISBN 9781501365706

Specific

External links 

 
 2020 video interview with Bruce Milne
 https://www.discogs.com/label/138179-In-Fidelity
 https://www.discogs.com/label/14106-Au-Go-Go?sort=year&sort_order=asc
 https://www.discogs.com/label/62721-Reliant-Records
 https://www.discogs.com/label/66977-Giant-Claw

Living people
1957 births
Australian music journalists
Australian radio journalists